Euxoamorpha eschata is a moth of the family Noctuidae. It is found in the Magallanes and Antartica Chilena Region of Chile and Bariloche and Buenos Aires in Argentina.

The wingspan is 33–35 mm. Adults are on wing from November to February.

External links
 Noctuinae of Chile

Noctuinae